Huddersfield Town's 1976–77 campaign was Huddersfield Town's second season in the 4th Division. Under Tom Johnston, Town almost gained promotion back to the 3rd Division, but a dreadful end to the season saw Town finish in 9th place with 50 points, 9 points off 4th place, which was taken by rivals Bradford City.

Squad at the start of the season

Review
Town had a mixed start to the season, with wins and draws seeming to come from all over the place. Although they were never on a massive losing or unbeaten run under Tom Johnston, they mainly relied on new signing Kevin Johnson from Hartlepool, who scored 13 goals during the season.

They had a run of 7 straight wins during late January to early March saw Town climb ever nearer to promotion, but the last nine games (6 of them under Johnston's replacement, John Haselden) saw Town fail to win a single match, which saw Town slumber down the table into a final position of 9th place, just 14 points off 4th place, which was taken up by rivals Bradford City.

Squad at the end of the season

Results

Division Four

FA Cup

Football League Cup

Appearances and goals

Huddersfield Town A.F.C. seasons
Huddersfield Town F.C.